Istanbul Şehir University (literally City University of Istanbul) was a private, non-profit university located in Istanbul, Turkey. It was established in 2008 by the Bilim ve Sanat Vakfı (BiSaV or BSV). The university started its education in the academic year of 2010–11 at its campus in Altunizade, Üsküdar, following a ceremony held on October 5, 2010 that was attended by then State President Abdullah Gül, Prime Minister Recep Tayyip Erdoğan and Minister of Foreign Affairs Ahmet Davutoğlu. The university was closed down on June 30, 2020, after it faced financial difficulties stemming from a legal land dispute, which in turn was fueled by a bitter political feud.

Organization
The university had, as of (2016), six faculties, three graduate institutes, a vocational high school, four research centers, and a language school, organized as follows:
College of Humanities and Social Sciences
Political Science and International Relations (in English)
Political Science and International Relations (in Turkish)
Sociology (in English)
Psychology (in English)
Psychology (in Turkish)
History (in English)
Turkish Language and Literature (mainly in Turkish, but few courses are in English)
Philosophy (in English)
College of Engineering and Natural Sciences
Computer Science & Engineering (in English)
CS Faculty Members
Electrical Engineering (in English)
Industrial Engineering (in English)
Industrial Engineering (in Turkish)
School of Management and Administrative Sciences
Management (in English)
International Trade and Management (in English)
Entrepreneurship (in Turkish)
Management Information Systems (in Turkish)
Economics (in English)
College of Communications
Cinema and Television (in English)
Cinema and Television (in Turkish)
Public Relations (in Turkish)
School of Law (mainly in Turkish, but few courses are in English)
School of Islamic Studies (in Turkish, English, and Arabic)
Graduate School of Humanities and Social Sciences
Cultural Studies (in English)
Political Science and International Relations (in English)
Modern Turkish Studies (in English)
History (in English)
Sociology (in English)
Public Law (in Turkish)
Private Law (in Turkish)
Clinical Psychology (in Turkish)
Urban Studies (in Turkish)
Cinema and Television (in Turkish)
Graduate School of Business
Business Non-Thesis Graduate Program (in Turkish)
Executive MBA (in Turkish)
Executive MBA (in English)
Graduate School  of Natural and Applied Sciences
Electronics and Computer Engineering (in English)
Industrial and Systems Engineering (in English)
Cybersecurity Engineering (in Turkish)
Data Science (in English)
Vocational High School (all in Turkish)
School of Justice
Computer Programming
Child Development
Photography and Videography
Graphic Design
Research Centers
 Center for Urban Studies
 Center for Higher Education Studies
 Center for Modern Turkish Studies
 Technology Transfer Office
School of Languages
Sehir English Preparatory Program (SEPP)
Turkish for International Students
the School offers also language courses in: Arabic, Chinese, French, German, Greek, Latin, Persian, Russian, Spanish, (Ottoman) Turkish, ...

Campus
Istanbul Şehir University had three campuses, West Campus, East Campus, and South Campus, all of which were located in Altunizade, Üsküdar. Later, during the academic year 2017–18, Istanbul Şehir University moved to its main campus in Dragos, Kartal, where construction was long delayed due to environmental concerns.

The Dragos campus had a number of facilities and amenities including an on-campus dorm, a library, a soccer field, a student center with numerous restaurants, and a large outdoor rec area.

Financial crisis and closure
In November 2019, the university faced financial trouble and was unable to pay the salaries of faculty members and the scholarships of students despite its revenue of millions of dollars. The reason was a freeze on its assets imposed by a court order, after a year-long trial, on request for an arrestment of funds by the state-owned Halkbank, which  had concerns regarding the pay back of a US$70 million credit. A real estate, which belonged to the state-owned monopoly company Tekel, was transferred free of charge to the university as campus ground, and became subject of security for a credit from the Halkbank. The real estate lost its security status when the Council of State ruled at the last instance in favor of the Chamber of Architects branch of the Union of Chambers of Turkish Engineers and Architects  (TMMOB) overturning the court's decision in the case. It was claimed by university representatives that the measure was of a political rather than technical nature due to the political fallout between Erdoğan and Ahmet Davutoğlu, the latter being a co-founder of the university.

By mid December 2019, the Council of Higher Education (YÖK) ruled for a temporary handover of Istanbul Şehir University to Marmara University, which was the "guarantor university" of the former. It was stated that the university was unable to continue its educational activities due to its financial situation. The operation license for education of the university was then suspended.

With the Presidential decree no. 2708 issued on June 30, 2020, the official authorization of Istanbul Şehir University was revoked. The Council of Higher Education (YÖK), after a general meeting on June 30, 2020, later announced that the students of Istanbul Şehir University were to be transferred to Marmara University.

References

External links
Istanbul Sehir University Turkish
Istanbul Sehir University English

 
Educational institutions established in 2008
Universities and colleges in Istanbul
Private universities and colleges in Turkey
Kartal
Üsküdar
2008 establishments in Turkey
2020 disestablishments in Turkey
Defunct universities and colleges in Turkey
Marmara University